John F. Smith is an American soap opera writer and producer. During the WGA strike, he chose  with the WGA and continued working.

Smith is best known for his stints as head writer of The Bold and the Beautiful and The Young and the Restless. Prior to Smith's tenure on Y&R, there was a period of widespread audience erosion. When John Smith was producer, ratings decreased by over 2 million viewers. Most of the decrease occurred in 2004 when Smith co-wrote the show with longtime Y&R scribe, Kay Alden.

Positions held
The Bold and the Beautiful
Script Writer: January 22, 2008 – present
Breakdown Writer: January 22, 2008 – present
Executive Storyline Consultant: 2002 - 2003
Associate Head Writer: 1987 - 2002

The Young and the Restless
Co-Executive Producer: 2003- May 12, 2006
Co-Head Writer: June 2002 - November 2006
Associate Head Writer: 1986 - June 2002
Script Writer: 1979 - 1986

Awards and nominations
Smith has been nominated for and won numerous Daytime Emmy, Writers Guild of America, and Producers Guild of America Awards.

Head Writing Tenure

Executive Producing Tenure

References

External links
CBS Daytime: Y&R & B&B

Living people
American soap opera writers
American male television writers
Daytime Emmy Award winners
Soap opera producers
Place of birth missing (living people)
Year of birth missing (living people)
American television producers
Writers Guild of America Award winners
American male writers
American male screenwriters